Operation Creature Feature is a puzzle game developed by London Studio in association with Playlogic Entertainment for the PlayStation 3 platform, which utilizes the PlayStation Eye camera peripheral. It was released on the European PlayStation Store on October 25, 2007 and appeared on the North American PlayStation Store on November 20, 2007.

Gameplay 
In this unique PlayStation Eye puzzler title, players must help the Blurbs find their way to safety. Players use their hands to grab and direct the different Blurb characters around each stage's challenges. Hand motions are used to coax or push them about as they guide them towards the goal.

See also 
PlayStation Eye
Tori-Emaki

References 

2007 video games
London Studio games
Playlogic Entertainment games
PlayStation 3 games
PlayStation 3-only games
PlayStation Eye games
PlayStation Network games
Single-player video games
Sony Interactive Entertainment games
Video games developed in the United Kingdom